Nangla Rawa is a village in Baraut Tahsil and Baghpat in the Indian State of Uttar Pradesh. It is 26 km from Bagpat.

Geography

It has an average elevation of 223 metres (731 feet). Baraut is Nearest Railway Station, just 11 km away from Nangla Rawa.

Demographics

According to the 2011 census Nagla Rawa had a population of 1,531, out of which males were 830 and females were 701. Nagla Rawa has an average literacy rate of 75.45%, Male literacy is 87.57%, and female literacy is 61.08%. In Nagla Rawa.

References

Cities and towns in Bagpat district